Salazaria is the generic name of two groups of organisms:

Salazaria (butterfly), a genus of butterflies in the family Lycaenidae
Salazaria (plant), a genus of plants in the family Lamiaceae